is a Japanese voice actor. He is the member of TAB Production.

Voice roles
Gen in Barefoot Gen
Ogasawara Yuunosuke in Azuki-chan
Takashi Yamazaki in Cardcaptor Sakura
Kenji Ninomiya in Kamichu!
Subaru Sumeragi in X/1999
Jun Misugi in Captain Tsubasa (Road to 2002)
Sin in Guilty Gear 2: Overture, Guilty Gear Xrd, Guilty Gear Strive
Ichirō Sumishiba in Dragon Drive
Uchida Kazuhiro in Yomigaeru Sora – Rescue Wings

Drama CDs
GENE Tenshi wa Sakareru (Raka)
Love Mode (Naoya Shirakawa)
Soshite Koi ga Hajimaru (Miki Tamura)

References

External links
 

1971 births
Living people
Male voice actors from Hiroshima
Japanese male child actors
Japanese male video game actors
Japanese male voice actors
20th-century Japanese male actors
21st-century Japanese male actors